During the 1998–99 English football season, Leicester City competed in the FA Premier League (known as the FA Carling Premiership for sponsorship reasons).

Season summary
Leicester City repeated the previous season's 10th place in the Premiership, earning Martin O'Neill more credit for achieving strong finishes on a relatively limited budget. But the club's best chance of a UEFA Cup place was blown in late March when they lost to Tottenham Hotspur in the Worthington Cup final. At least City fans had the satisfaction of holding on to the highly rated O'Neill, who had seemed certain to desert the club for Leeds United early in the season.

Kit
Leicester's season's kit was manufactured by Fox Leisure and their shirt was sponsored by the British food snack manufacturer Walkers Crisps.

Final league table

Results summary

Results by round

Results

Pre-season

FA Premier League

FA Cup

League Cup

Squad

Left club during season

Reserve squad

Club staff

{| class="wikitable" style="text-align:left;"
|-
!colspan=2 style="color:white; background:#2B55DB;"|First Team & Youth Team Management
|-
! style="width:290px;"|Role !! style="width:150px;"|Person
|-
| First Team Manager ||  Martin O'Neill
|-
| First Team Assistant Manager ||  John Robertson
|-
| First Team Coach ||  Steve Walford
|-
| Goalkeeping Coach ||  Jim McDonagh
|-
| Reserve Team Coach ||  Paul Franklin
|-
| Physiotherapist || Mick Yeoman
|-
| Physiotherapist || Alan Smith
|-
| Youth Academy Manager ||  David Nish
|-
| Youth Academy Assistant Manager ||  Neville Hamilton
|-
| Youth Academy Assistant Manager ||  Jon Rudkin
|-
| Youth Academy Physiotherapist || Ian Andrews
|-
| Youth Development Officer || Steve Sims
|-
| Chief Scout ||  Jim Melrose
|-
| Kit Manager ||  Paul McAndrew
|-

Statistics

Appearances, goals and cards
(Starting appearances + substitute appearances)

Assists
{| class="wikitable" style="text-align:center;"
|-
!"width:35px;"|
!"width:35px;"|
!"width:35px;"|
!"width:200px;"|Player
!"width:75px;"|Premiership
!"width:75px;"|FA Cup
!"width:75px;"|League Cup
!"width:75px;"|Total
|-
|rowspan=1| 1 || MF || 11 || align=left| Steve Guppy || 11 || 0 || 3 || 14
|-
|rowspan=4| 2 || FW || 9 || align=left| Emile Heskey || 3 || 2 || 0 || 5 
|-
| MF || 7 || align=left| Neil Lennon || 3 || 0 || 2 || 5
|-
| MF || 6 || align=left| Muzzy Izzet || 2 || 0 || 3 || 5
|-
| MF || 14 || align=left| Robbie Savage || 2 || 0 || 3 || 5
|-
|rowspan=1| 4 || DF || 18 || align=left| Matt Elliott || 2 || 1 || 1 || 4 
|-
|rowspan=2| 5 || DF || 4 || align=left| Gerry Taggart || 2 || 0 || 0 || 2
|-
| MF || 37 || align=left| Theodoros Zagorakis || 2 || 0 || 0 || 2
|-
|rowspan=7| 6 || MF || 24 || align=left| Andrew Impey || 1 || 0 || 0 || 1
|-
| DF || 19 || align=left| Robert Ullathorne || 1 || 0 || 0 || 1
|-
| DF || 5 || align=left| Steve Walsh || 1 || 0 || 0 || 1
|-
| FW || 27 || align=left| Tony Cottee || 0 || 1 || 0 || 1
|-
| DF || 3 || align=left| Frank Sinclair || 0 || 0 || 1 || 1
|-
| MF || 10 || align=left| Garry Parker || 0 || 0 || 1 || 1
|-
| MF || 16 || align=left| Stuart Campbell || 0 || 0 || 1 || 1
|-
!colspan="4"|Total || 30 || 4 || 15 || 49
|-

Transfers

In

Out

Transfers in:  £5,600,000
Transfers out:  £700,000
Total spending:  £4,900,000

References

Leicester City F.C. seasons
Leicester City